Vladimir Zantaria is a poet and politician from Abkhazia. From 1999 until 2004 he served first as Minister for Culture and then as Vice Premier in the Government of President Ardzinba.

Early life and career
Zantaria was born on 27 September 1953 in the village of Tamysh, Ochamchira District. In 1975, he graduated from the philological faculty of the Sukhumi State Pedagogical Institute.

Political career
Zantaria was a member of the 1st convocation of the People's Assembly from 1992 to 1997. Between 1993 and 1994, he was Chairman of the State TV and Radio.

In 1999, following the re-election of President Vladislav Ardzinba, Zantaria became Minister for Culture in the cabinet of Prime Minister Viacheslav Tsugba. On 19 July 2001, he was appointed as Vice Premier instead under Tsugba's successor Anri Jergenia. He was reappointed in the cabinets of Gennadi Gagulia and Raul Khajimba, serving until 14 December 2004.

References

1953 births
Living people
People from Ochamchira District
Ministers for Culture of Abkhazia
1st convocation of the People's Assembly of Abkhazia
Vice Premiers of Abkhazia
Abkhazian poets